The term 20 kilometres may refer to two different races in athletics:

20 kilometres race walk
20 kilometres road running race